Charles Robert Wynn-Carington, 1st Marquess of Lincolnshire,  (16 May 1843 – 13 June 1928), known as the Lord Carrington from 1868 to 1895, and as the Earl Carrington from 1895 to 1912, was a British Liberal politician and aristocrat. He was Governor of New South Wales from 1885 to 1890.

Background
Charles Robert Carrington was born at Whitehall on 16 May 1843, the son of Robert Carrington, 2nd Baron Carrington, and his second wife Charlotte, the younger daughter of Peter Drummond-Burrell, 22nd Baron Willoughby de Eresby. The Hon. Sir William Carington and Rupert Carington, 4th Baron Carrington, were his younger brothers, while Peter Carington, 6th Baron Carrington, was his grand-nephew. He was educated at Eton and Trinity College, Cambridge. He was a lifelong friend of King Edward VII, having first met him in 1854, and became his Aide-de-camp when he was the Prince of Wales.

On his mother's death in 1879 he became joint hereditary Lord Great Chamberlain of England. Born Charles Carrington, he and his two brothers assumed by royal licence the surname of Carington in 1880. In 1896 he assumed by royal licence the surname of Wynn-Carington.

Political career
Carrington sat in the House of Commons as a Liberal for High Wycombe from 1865 until he succeeded his father to the baronies in 1868. He served under William Ewart Gladstone as Captain of the Honourable Corps of Gentlemen-at-Arms from 1881 to 1885, and was sworn of the Privy Council in 1881.

Wynn-Carrington was in India 1875–1876, appointed Honourable Corps of Gentlemen at Arms during 1881–1885, and was appointed to be the Governor of New South Wales in 1885 until 1890 and was appointed to the Order of St Michael and St George as a Knight Grand Cross in June 1885. He again held office under Gladstone and later Lord Rosebery as Lord Chamberlain of the Household from 1892 to 1895. The latter year he was created Viscount Wendover, of Chepping Wycombe, in the County of Buckingham, and Earl Carrington.

In early 1901 he was appointed by King Edward VII to lead a special diplomatic mission to announce the King's accession to the governments of France, Spain, and Portugal. He also bore St Edward's Staff at the coronation of King Edward VII.

After the Liberals returned to power in 1905 he served as President of the Board of Agriculture between 1905 and 1911 and as Lord Privy Seal between 1911 and 1912, with a seat in the cabinet in Sir Henry Campbell-Bannerman and H. H. Asquith's ministries. He was made a Knight of the Garter in 1906 and in 1912 he was further honoured when he was made Marquess of Lincolnshire.

A noted land reformer, Carrington was a supporter of Lloyd George's redistributive "People's Budget", which he regarded as "bold, Liberal and humane".

Freemasonry
He was initiated into Isaac Newton University Lodge No. 859, Cambridge, on 28 October 1861 at the age of 18, passed in Cairo some 8 years later, and raised in Royal York Lodge of Perseverance No. 7 on 6 October 1875. On 3 January 1882 he became a member of Royal Alpha Lodge No. 16. Even though he was not a past Master of a Lodge, he was appointed Senior Grand Warden of the United Grand Lodge of England in 1882.

When he became Governor of New South Wales, he found a rivalry of lodges working under the United Grand Lodge of England and the Grand Lodge of Scotland as well as lodges working under the locally formed (1877) Grand Lodge of New South Wales. Trying to unite the lodges, he became firstly District Grand Master of New South Wales, and then the first Grand Master of the newly consecrated United Grand Lodge of New South Wales. However, as he had still not yet been installed as a Worshipful Master, he was first made Worshipful Master at sight of the Lodge Ionic No. 15. Nine senior Masons were present, including Samuel Way. In 1890 he was appointed Provincial Grand Master of Buckinghamshire and after serving five years, he was made Grand Representative in England of the United Grand Lodge of New South Wales.

Family

Carrington married the Hon. Cecilia Margaret Harbord (1856–1934), daughter of Charles Harbord, 5th Baron Suffield, and Cecilia Annetta Baring, in 1878. They had one son and five daughters. Their only son, Albert Edward Charles Robert Wynn-Carington, Viscount Wendover (1895–1915), died on 19 May 1915 of complications following the amputation of an arm when he was wounded in the fighting at Ypres during World War I.

In addition to family life, Lord Carrington was logged by the police for homosexual activity: his name appears in the one of the notebooks of the high-profile Scotland Yard detective Donald Swanson.

Having earlier sold his ancestral home, Wycombe Abbey (which became a private girls' boarding-school), Lincolnshire died at his home, Daws Hill House, High Wycombe, on 13 June 1928. The baronies (but not his other titles) passed to his younger brother, Rupert. The marquessate, earldom and viscountcy became extinct. Cecilia, Marchioness of Lincolnshire, died in 1934, aged 78.

Issue

Other descendants
Among notable descendants are Stephen Wilson, 6th Baron Nunburnholme, Patrick Chichester, 8th Marquess of Donegall, and Rufus Keppel, 10th Earl of Albemarle.

Cousins Tiggy and Eleanor Legge-Bourke are his descendants through his fifth daughter; they are both granddaughters of politician Sir Harry Legge-Bourke, only son of Lt. Nigel Legge-Bourke.

Ancestry

References

Citations

Bibliography
 
 
 Davenport-Nines, Richard. "A Radical Lord Chamberlain at a Tory Court: Lord Carrington, 1892–95." The Court Historian 16.2 (2011): 205-225.

 
 
 Venn, J. A. (1953). Alumni Cantabrigienses, part 2, 5 (Cambridge: Cambridge University Press). p. 545

External links

 

1843 births
1928 deaths
Deputy Lieutenants of Caernarvonshire
Governors of New South Wales
Knights Grand Cross of the Order of St Michael and St George
Garter Knights appointed by Edward VII
Liberal Party (UK) MPs for English constituencies
Lord-Lieutenants of Buckinghamshire
Members of the Privy Council of the United Kingdom
Members of London County Council
UK MPs 1865–1868
UK MPs who inherited peerages
UK MPs who were granted peerages
Honourable Corps of Gentlemen at Arms
Progressive Party (London) politicians
Robert
Freemasons of the United Grand Lodge of England
Australian Freemasons
British Freemasons
Masonic Grand Masters
Members of Isaac Newton University Lodge
Alumni of Trinity College, Cambridge
Colony of New South Wales people
Charles
Peers of the United Kingdom created by Queen Victoria